Mark Riley (born 16 June 1967 in New Zealand) is a former rugby league footballer. He played for a number of English rugby league sides during the 1990s.

Playing career
While playing for the Otahuhu Leopards in the Auckland Rugby League competition in 1990 he won the Best and Fairest award.

A , Riley enjoyed a particularly successful season with the then London Crusaders in 1990–91, when he and  Mark Johnson each challenged for the title of leading try-scorer in the second tier of English rugby league. He later went on to play a part in a successful promotion winning season with Swinton Lions in 1996, breaking the club's most tries in a match record, scoring 6 vs Prescot Panthers, 11 August 1996.

References

External links
Rugby League Project

1967 births
Living people
London Broncos players
New Zealand rugby league players
Otahuhu Leopards players
Rugby league halfbacks
Swinton Lions players